Long Live Love is the twelfth studio album by American musician Kirk Franklin. RCA Inspiration, a division of RCA Records, alongside Fo Yo Soul Recordings released the album on May 31, 2019. It debuted at number-one on the US Top Gospel Albums chart, becoming his 13th release to top the chart, with 20,000 equivalent album units earned in its first week. With this, Franklin became the first artist to simultaneously top all five Billboard gospel charts: Top Gospel Albums, Hot Gospel Songs, Gospel Airplay, Gospel Streaming Songs and Gospel Digital Song Sales.

The album received two Grammys at the 62nd Annual Grammy Awards, where it won Best Gospel Album and the single "Love Theory" won Best Gospel Song.

Background
Following the release of the first single, "Love Theory", the title of the album was announced in March 2019 along with its release date and an upcoming tour in support of the album.

Critical reception

Timothy Yap of Hallels.com gave the album a positive review, rating the album 4 stars out of 5. In his review he said " It canvasses a plethora of topics from social hatred to idolatry to the Cross. It exposes us to all sub-genres of Gospel music" from old school choir to soul-massaging ballads.  In short, this album contains everything we love about Franklin."

Track listing

Personnel

Musicians
 Kirk Franklin: Keyboards
 Shaun Martin: Keyboards, Programming, Additional Keyboards
 Mark Lettieri: Guitar 
 Kermit Wells: Hammond B-3
 Matthew Ramsey: Bass
 Caziah Franklin: Drums
 Maxwell Stark: Programming
 Johnnie Murray: Guitar
 Mike Bereal: Hammond B-3
 Keith Taylor: Bass
 Terry Baker: Drums
 Philip Lassiter: Trumpet
 Doug DeHays: Saxophone
 Erik Hughes: Trombone

Vocalists
 Anaysha Figueroa
 Charmaine Broome
 Melodie Rose
 Amber Bullock
 Darian Yancey
 Minon Sarten
 Emerald Boyd
 Sharon Willingham 
 Deon Yancey
 Eric Dawkins
 Isaac Carree
 Michael Bethany

Charts

References

2019 albums
Grammy Award for Best Gospel Album
Kirk Franklin albums
RCA Records albums